Maksim Sergeyevich Khramtsov (born 12 January 1998), sometimes spelled as Khramtcov, is a male Russian Taekwondo practitioner who won gold medals at the 2020 Summer Olympics and the 2017 World Taekwondo Championships. Khramtsov initially trained in karate, but in 2011 changed to taekwondo because he wanted to compete at the Olympics.

References

External links
 

Living people
1998 births
Russian male taekwondo practitioners
European Taekwondo Championships medalists
World Taekwondo Championships medalists
Taekwondo practitioners at the 2020 Summer Olympics
Medalists at the 2020 Summer Olympics
Olympic gold medalists for the Russian Olympic Committee athletes
Olympic medalists in taekwondo
Olympic taekwondo practitioners of Russia
21st-century Russian people